Skotoussa is a village and a former municipality in the Serres regional unit, Greece. Population 5,135 (2011). Since the 2011 local government reform it is part of the municipality Irakleia, of which it is a municipal unit. The municipal unit has an area of 99.433 km2.

Transport

Rail Transport
The settlement is served by Skotoussa railway station on the Thessaloniki-Alexandroupoli line, with daily services to Thessaloniki and Alexandroupolis.

References

Populated places in Serres (regional unit)

bg:Просеник (дем)
el:Δήμος Σκοτούσσας